Hope Air is a national charity that arranges free non-emergency medical flights for low-income Canadians who must travel far from home to access healthcare. Since its inception in 1986, the charity has arranged over 140,000 flights.  In 2018, the charity received viceregal patronage from Governor General Julie Payette. In 2011, Canadian comedian Rick Mercer became the charity's honorary patron. Airlines donating seats include Bearskin Airlines, WestJet, Central Mountain Air, Pacific Coastal Airlines, Porter Airlines, Air Canada Foundation, Northwestern Air, Air Creebec, Harbour Air Seaplanes and Pascan Aviation. Dedicated flights operated as Hope Air use Nav Canada airline designator HH, and telephony HOPE AIR.

History

Hope Air was founded in 1986 by Joan Rogers and Jinnie Bradshaw under the name Mission Air Transportation Network. In the early years, corporations signed up with Mission Air to use their planes. However, soon after launching Mission Air attracted commercial airlines, with over 90 per cent of flights taking place through airline partners currently.

By 1993, the organization had provided over 10,000 flights.

In 1995, Romeo LeBlanc, then-Governor General of Canada, became Hope Air's first Viceregal patron. Every Governor General of Canada since has been the charity's patron.

In 1996, WestJet was founded and immediately donated its first flights to Hope Air. Its donations increased and WestJet is Hope Air's largest airline partner.

In 1999, Mission Air changed its name to Hope Air. Also in 1999, Hope Air began to partner with private pilots who began flying Hope Air clients on their aircraft, as part of the charity's Volunteer Pilot Program.

In 2001, Marc Garneau became a National Honorary Patron of Hope Air. He served in this role until 2015, when he resigned after being appointed Minister of Transport.

In 2006, the charity celebrated its 20th anniversary and arranged its 50,000th flight.

In 2010, British Columbia struck a partnership with Hope Air to provide flights to residents of the province who need to travel for healthcare. The province solidified its partnership with the charity by investing $1.5 million in 2015.

That same year, the organization arranged over 10,000 flights, the most ever in a single calendar year. On December 3, 2015, Hope Air celebrated its 100,000th flight.

In 2016, Hope Air celebrated its 30th anniversary. In the same year, Hope Air partnered with Prince Edward Island's provincial government to provide Confederation Bridge passes to Islanders who must travel off the Island to healthcare. This marks the first time in its history that Hope Air provided ground travel to patients.

How Hope Air operates

Hope Air provides flights under four main flight programs: Commercial Airline Donation Program, Flight Purchase Program, Volunteer Pilot Program and the Volunteer Program. The charity has a mixed donor base made up of individuals, foundations and corporations. A number of Canadian airlines provide in-kind donations of seats on scheduled flights.

The Commercial Airline Donation Program is based on partnerships with various Canadian airlines that donate seats on flights to Hope Air clients. In these cases the charity covers the cost of taxes and regular fees associated with airline tickets, while commercial airlines provide flight tickets.

The Flight Purchase Program entails Hope Air purchasing seats on commercial flights for Hope Air clients.

The Volunteer Pilot Program partners with private pilots who use their aircraft to fly Hope Air clients to medical appointments.

The Volunteer Program comprises over 160 volunteers across Canada who assist in Hope Air's office and contribute remotely. In 2018, volunteers donated over 5000 hours to sustaining Hope Air's mission in the areas of Client Care, Fund Development, Marketing & Communications, and Ambassadorship.

Hope Air's impact 
About 35 per cent of Hope Air Ccients say that they would cancel or postpone their appointment if Hope Air had not been able to help them. Another 34 per cent say they would have to travel at least four hours – and, for some, up to eight or 12 hours - to get to their appointment without Hope Air's help. The charity estimates that for every single person it helps, it positively impacts 45 other people in their community.

References

External links
 Hope Air
 "Hope & Faith," Canadian Living (March 2012), http://hopeair.org/news/Canadian_Living.pdf 
 "Hope Air and Rick Mercer establish a solid Sault connection," Sault this Week, http://www.saultthisweek.com/2011/10/05/hope-air-and-rick-mercer-establish-a-solid-sault-connection 
 "Transforming Tamara," Vancouver Sun, https://vancouversun.com/news/Transforming+Tamara+with+video/9753273/story.html 

Health charities in Canada